Plattsburg may refer to: 

Plattsburg, Indiana, U.S.
Plattsburg, Missouri , U.S.
USS Plattsburg (ID-1645), a United States Navy auxiliary cruiser

See also

 
 
 Plattsburgh (disambiguation)
 Pittsburg (disambiguation)
 Pittsburgh (disambiguation)